Tewis de Bruyn (born 5 August 1982) is a South African former rugby union footballer. He regularly played as a scrum-half and occasionally as a fly-half. He retired at the end of the 2013 season following a back injury to take up a coaching role at his alma mater, Grey College, Bloemfontein.

Career
De Bruyn started his career playing for the Potchefstroom–based  and spent two seasons there before transferring to the SWD Eagles in 2004. He moved again in 2006, joining the Boland Cavaliers before finally moving to Bloemfontein in late 2007. He played more than 130 games in all competitions for the Cheetahs.

References

Living people
1982 births
South African rugby union coaches
South African rugby union players
Rugby union scrum-halves
Cheetahs (rugby union) players
Free State Cheetahs players
Lyon OU players
Leopards (rugby union) players
Griffons (rugby union) players
SWD Eagles players
Boland Cavaliers players
Alumni of Grey College, Bloemfontein